Patrick Morineau (born 18 February 1951) is a French rower. He competed in the men's quadruple sculls event at the 1976 Summer Olympics.

References

1951 births
Living people
French male rowers
Olympic rowers of France
Rowers at the 1976 Summer Olympics
Place of birth missing (living people)